Acraea siliana is a butterfly in the family Nymphalidae. It is found on Madagascar. The habitat consists of forests.

Taxonomy
It is a member of the Acraea masamba  species group   -   but see also Pierre & Bernaud, 2014  Junior synonym of Acraea silia Mabille, 1887

References

Butterflies described in 1916
siliana
Endemic fauna of Madagascar
Butterflies of Africa